Christoph Wigelbeyer (born 1973) is an Austrian choir director, conductor, singer and music educator.

Life 
Born in Wels, Wigelbeyer completed singing school, piano and violin in his hometown and at the Linz Bruckner Conservatory within the framework of the Upper Austrian promotion of young talent. This was followed by teacher training in music education and instrumental music education with a focus on singing and choral conducting, as well as three years of solo singing training at the University of Music and Performing Arts Vienna, in addition to which he completed master classes and private lessons. In 1998, in his diploma thesis, he portrayed Ernst Ludwig Leitner, also born in Wels. A year later, he also wrote an essay about Leitner in the Österreichische Musikzeitschrift.

He sang, among others, in the Wiener Kammerchor and the Wiener Singverein (directed by ) and in the Vocal Ensemble Company of Music (conducted by ). On piano, he can be heard on Nancy Van de Vate's 1998 album Vol. IV together with Elke Eckerstorfer and Sybille Bouda, among others, with the piece Contrasts for two Pianos, six Hands (1984). With Eckerstorfer, he also played the Little Suite for twenty fingers op. 61b by Iván Eröd on a CD published in 1997 by the Department of Music Pedagogy at the University of Music and Performing Arts Vienna.

Part of the ensemble. In 2010, he founded the youth choir pro.vocant, which he directed until 2013.

Other projects of the choir under Wigelbeyer's direction include performances at the opening of Vienna's Life Ball (2014 and 2015), at the Milan Expo 2015, at the opening of the 2016 Carinthischer Sommer and at the Liszt Festival 2017 in Raiding.

He is also a lecturer at the Institute for Music Education Research, Music Didactics and Elementary Music Making at the University of Music and Performing Arts in Vienna.

Publications 
 Ernst Ludwig Leitner. Ein Portrait. Diploma Thesis in Music History, University of Music Vienna, 1998.
 Ernst Ludwig Leitner: „So weiß wie Schnee, so rot wie Blut.“ In Österreichische Musikzeitschrift, vol. 54, fascicule 7–8, 1999, .

Recordings 
 1997: Iván Eröd - Little Suite for twenty fingers op. 61b (with Elke Eckerstorfer; mdw/; CSM 9740-AI)
 1998: Contrasts for two Pianos, six Hands (1984; recording with Elke Eckerstorfer and Sybille Bouda) on Nancy Van de Vate - Vol. IV (Vienna Modern Masters).
 1999: Franz Liszt - Via crucis - Missa choralis  (vocals in the part Missa choralis; Carus-Verlag)
 2009: Leonard Bernstein - Bernstein: Mass (voice; Chandos Records)

Film recordings 
(made during his time as artistic director with the Neue Wiener Stimmen choir).
 2013: Hollywood in Vienna - "On to New Worlds" & A Tribute to James Horner.
 2014: Hollywood in Vienna - "Comedy Tonight" & A Tribute to Randy Newman.
 2015: Hollywood in Vienna - "Tales of Mystery" & A Tribute to James Newton Howard.
 2016: Hollywood in Vienna - "The Sound of Space" & A Tribute to Alexandre Desplat.

References

External links 

 

Austrian choral conductors
Austrian conductors (music)
Austrian classical pianists
Male classical pianists
21st-century Austrian male singers
Austrian music educators
University of Music and Performing Arts Vienna alumni
1973 births
Living people
People from Wels